Dr Timothy Charles Ayrton Tannock  (born 25 September 1957) is a British psychiatrist, Conservative Party politician and former Member of the European Parliament (MEP) for London.

Education

Tannock was educated at Bradfield College, before going up to read medicine at Balliol College, Oxford, followed by the Middlesex Hospital Medical School, London University, where he qualified as a doctor. He speaks French, Italian, Spanish and Portuguese having spent part of his early life living abroad.

He is a dual British and Irish citizen.

Political career 
Tannock was first elected to the European Parliament in 1999 and re-elected for his fourth term in 2014. He was Vice-President of the Human Rights Subcommittee of the Parliament 2004–07 and Vice-President of the EU-Ukraine PCC delegation 2004–09. He was Vice-President of the EP Delegation to the NATO Parliamentary Assembly 2009–14, and was the UK Conservative Foreign Affairs Spokesman 2002–2019, and ECR Co-ordinator (Spokesman) 2009–2019 on the Foreign Affairs Committee. He was President of the Friends of Taiwan Group 2004-9 and was adviser to the UK Overseas Territories Association in the European Parliament, and was Vice-Chairman of European Friends of Israel 2006–11. He was President of the European Parliament Friends of Kurdistan 2014–2019. He was appointed a Commissioner for Human Rights of the British Conservative Party in 2011 and reappointed in 2015. The Sunday Times carried a two page spread on Dr Tannock https://www.thetimes.co.uk/article/tory-mep-kept-energy-share-options-secret-c8prkt735t2
Tannock reported the Sunday Thames to the Press Complaints Commission http://www.pcc.org.uk/cases/adjudicated.html?article=Nzg4OA==
but his complaint was rejected and the Sunday Times was vindicated in making claims that share options were not effectively declared in a now liquidated fracking company but had made it clear that the EU Parliament authorities had cleared Tannock of any breach of its rules on declaration of members' interests.

Tannock was Rapporteur, shadow Rapporteur and co-author on numerous Reports and Joint Resolutions of the European Parliament over his 20 years as MEP. 

Notably in 2004 he was Rapporteur on the AFET Committee for the European Neighbourhood Policy Report and again in 2007 AFET Rapporteur for the Eastern Partnership Dimension of the ENP. In 2006 he was responsible as Rapporteur on the ECON Committee for the Report setting out Tax and Duty Free Allowances imported by travellers from third countries, still in force to date. In 2008 he was AFET Rapporteur for the opinion on the EU-India Free Trade Agreement. In 2012 he was AFET Rapporteur for the EU strategy for the Horn of Africa. In 2012 he was AFET Rapporteur on the opinion on the EU/China agreement following Bulgarian and Romanian accession. In 2013 He was AFET Rapporteur on the Human rights situation in the Sahel Region of Africa. In 2013 he was AFET Rapporteur for the opinion on the Efforts of the international community in the area of development and of state building in South Sudan. Between 2009 and 2019 he was AFET Rapporteur for the annual update EP Reports on Montenegro as an EU accession candidate country. In 2015 he was AFET Rapporteur on the opinion on Prevention of radicalisation and recruitment of EU citizens by terrorist organisations. In 2016 he was AFET Rapporteur on the EU/Canada Strategic Partnership Agreement. In 2017 he was AFET Rapporteur on the EU/New Zealand Partnership Agreement on Relations and Cooperation. In 2018 he was AFET Rapporteur on the modernised Association Agreement between the EU and Chile. 
Following the 2016 UK EU Referendum result Tannock wrote three ECR booklets on the critical UK internal and external security implications of Brexit as well as the consequences of Brexit in Ireland. They are published as "Brexit: The Security Dimension" in early 2017, "The Case for a New WEU" in 2018, and a "Hong Kong in Ireland: Northern Ireland's Brexit Opportunity" in late 2018. In November 2020 he coedited with Alistair Burt the Conservative Group for Europe Publication: "European Britain Global Britain: Foreign Affairs and International Relations Post-Brexit" which sets out a vision for UK working more closely with its EU partners on Foreign Policy, Defence and Security matters globally.

A pro-European, Tannock applied for, and obtained, Irish citizenship in response to Brexit, describing himself as a "pretty angry pro-European Tory". Tannock also stated with regards to what has happened since the Brexit referendum that "I am quite ashamed to be British in many ways", speaking in regards to the treatment of EU citizens. He told The Irish Times that he was proud to be Irish and was planning a "pilgrimage" to Ireland.

Tannock is a founder of #Masks4All, and co-signed an open letter of 100 Doctors titled "why are we still prevaricating over face masks"?

Psychiatric career 
Before being elected to the European Parliament, he was a Consultant psychiatrist at University College Hospital and Honorary Senior Lecturer at UCL Medical School. He was assistant Research Secretary of the Bow Group from 1989 to 1990, publishing Bow Group papers and made several contributions to the scientific literature particularly in the field of chronic fatigue syndrome and anxiety disorders as a medical researcher. Since losing his seat in July 2019 as an MEP Tannock has returned to part-time clinical practice in the NHS as a Consultant Psychiatrist in London. Tannock is married with three children.

Honours
Tannock has been given the Freedom of the City of Cartagena de Indias and is a Freeman of the City of London. He was decorated by the President of Ukraine as Knight (3rd Grade) of the Order of Merit (Ukraine) in 2006. He was awarded in 2009 the Medal of Mkhitar Gosh by the President of Armenia. In 2013 he was awarded an honorary doctorate by Yerevan State University. In 2010 he was created a Grand Officer of the Order of San Carlos of the Republic of Colombia for services in the field of diplomacy and international relations. In 2011 the Legislative Yuan of Taiwan (ROC) Medal of Honour was conferred upon him for his "services to parliamentary diplomacy". In 2013 he was awarded the Presidential Order of Excellence by the President of Georgia. In 2014 he was awarded the Order of the Brilliant Star with Grand Cordon by the President of Taiwan (ROC). In 2016 he was awarded by the President of Armenia the Medal of Gratitude for his long standing services towards the international recognition of the Armenian genocide. In 2018 he was awarded the "Special Diploma of Appreciation" of the Slovak Foreign Ministry for services to Slovak international relations during the 25th independence anniversary celebration of the country. In July 2019 after the end of mandate as MEP he was awarded by the President of Montenegro the 1st Class Grade of the "Order of the Montenegrin Flag" in recognition of his wide-ranging work as Standing Rapporteur in the European Parliament for EU-Montenegrin relations between 2009 and 2019. 
He was appointed Member of the Order of the British Empire (MBE) in the 2020 New Year Honours for political service to international relations and human rights.

Notes

External links
Tannock's home page
Tannock's commentaries at Project Syndicate
Profile at European Parliament website
Charles Tannock – Biography
Debrett's People of Today

1957 births
Living people
Alumni of Balliol College, Oxford
English psychiatrists
English people of Irish descent
British people of Scottish descent
Conservative Party (UK) MEPs
MEPs for England 1999–2004
MEPs for England 2004–2009
MEPs for England 2009–2014
MEPs for England 2014–2019
Members of the Bow Group
People educated at Bradfield College
Politicians from Aldershot
Members of the Order of the British Empire
Medical doctors from Aldershot